MVDS is an acronym for terrestrial "Multipoint Video Distribution System".

MVDS currently is a part of broader MWS (Multimedia Wireless System) standards.
In European Union MWS works in 10.7–13.5 and 40.5–43.5 GHz frequency bands.

Research for 42 GHz frequency has been done under the European Commition EMBRACE (Efficient Millimetre Broadband Radio Access for Convergence and Evolution) initiative.

Standards

ETSI 

EN 300 748
EN 301 215-3
EN 301 997-2

UK Standards
MPT 1550 (obsolete)
MPT 1560 (obsolete)

CEPT
ERC/DEC/(99)15
ECC/REC/(01)04

Manufacturers of MVDS equipment
MDS America Inc
Newtec
EF Data
BluWan
Philips Broadband Network
Hughes Network systems
Thales Group (Thomson)
Trophy electronics
Technosystem Digital Network S.p.A. (TDN)
Marconi Technology Centres (GMTT)
United Monolithic Semiconductors (UMS)
DOK Ltd (Elvalink)
Q-par Angus Ltd 
ROKS

Mobile technology